Rajendra Bhaskarrao Shingne is an Indian politician and a member of 9th, 10th, 11th, 12th and 14th Legislative Assembly of Maharashtra. He was  Cabinet Minister for Food and Drugs administration in the Government of Maharashtra

Early life and education
Shingne was born 30 March 1960 in Buldhana district of Maharashtra to his father Bhaskarrao Shingne. In 1988, he had completed H.S.C. from Shivaji High School, Buldhana (Maharashtra State Board) and he got B.A.M.S. degree in 1993, from Shri Gurudev Ayurvedic College, Mojhari, District Amravati. (Nagpur University).

Political career
Shingne is a prominent leader of the Nationalist Congress Party (NCP) from Vidarbha and is now the state vice-president of Nationalist Congress Party. Shingne served as a Member of Legislative Assembly from Sindkhed Raja Constituency, the birthplace of Rashtramata Rajmata Jijabai Bhosale. Shingne was elected to the Buldhana District Cooperative Credit Society in 1991. He started his journey in Maharashtra Assembly in 1995 when elected from Sindkhed Raja as an Independent candidate and joined Nationalist Congress Party in 1999 along with prominent leaders like Rajesh Tope Jayant Patil Manohar Naik and R. R. Patil as well. Re-elected MLA in 1999 from Nationalist Congress Party, Shingne was a Minister of State for Education and in 2004 served as the Minister of State for Revenue. He was appointed cabinet minister for Health and Family Welfare in 2008 and 2009.

Post held

References

Nationalist Congress Party politicians from Maharashtra
Politicians from Nagpur
Living people
1960 births